The Rationalist Association, originally the Rationalist Press Association, is an organization in the United Kingdom, founded in 1885 by a group of freethinkers who were unhappy with the increasingly political and decreasingly intellectual tenor of the British secularist movement. The purpose of the Rationalist Press Association was to publish literature that was too anti-religious to be handled by mainstream publishers and booksellers. The Rationalist Press Association changed its name to "The Rationalist Association" in 2002.

History

The impetus for the creation of the Rationalist Press Association can be traced back to Charles Albert Watts, the publisher who printed the National Reformer and a majority of Charles Bradlaugh's books.  In 1890 Watts formed the Propagandist Press Committee, with George Jacob Holyoake as President, in order to circumvent the problem caused by booksellers who refused to handle secularist books.  Holyoake remained president as the committee changed its name to the Rationalist Press Committee and finally settled on the Rationalist Press Association in 1899.  Members of the association paid a subscription fee and received books annually to the value of that fee.

The Association became quite successful after 1902, when it started selling reprints of serious scientific works by authors such as Julian Huxley, Ernst Haeckel and Matthew Arnold. It achieved even greater success through the Thinker's Library series of books, published by Watts & Co. from 1929 until 1951 under the leadership of Charles Watts's son Fredrick.  The Association's continued success in selling books of a heretical nature, mostly by agnostic or atheist authors, contributed to a growing rationalist zeal and a growing demand for this type of literature.  By 1959 the Association had reached its highest membership, with more than 5,000 members.  Yet its success also contributed to its demise: rationalist literature became so popular that the Association's readership was taken by larger, more established mainstream publishers.  The result was a steady decline in membership.

In 2002 the Association changed its name to The Rationalist Association. It currently publishes a quarterly magazine, the New Humanist.

In 2006 Jonathan Miller was chosen to be its President. He said in response to being chosen: "Not believing in religion is very widespread, but I think this community gets overlooked. I am flattered and honoured".

Presidents and chairs

See also
Conway Hall Ethical Society
Humanists UK
International Humanist and Ethical Union
National Secular Society
Rationalist Society of Australia

References

Bibliography 
  A study in political psychology.

External links
 
 Rationalist Association Archive Collection at Archives Hub
 Works printed by the Rationalist Press Association at WorldCat

Humanist associations
Political advocacy groups in the United Kingdom
Organizations established in 1899
Rationalism
Secularism in the United Kingdom
1899 establishments in the United Kingdom